Sunrisers Hyderabad (stylised as SunRisers Hyderabad,  SRH) are  a franchise cricket team based in Hyderabad, Telangana, India, that plays in the Indian Premier League (IPL). The franchise is owned by Kalanithi Maran of the SUN Group and was founded in 2012 after the Hyderabad-based Deccan Chargers were terminated by the IPL. The team is currently coached by Brian Lara and captained by Aiden Markram. Their primary home ground is the Rajiv Gandhi International Cricket Stadium, Hyderabad, which has capacity of 55,000.

The team made their first IPL appearance in 2013, where they reached the playoffs, eventually finishing in fourth place. The Sunrisers won their maiden IPL title in the 2016 season, defeating the Royal Challengers Bangalore by 8 runs in the final. The team has qualified for the play-off stage of the tournament in every season since 2016. In 2018, the team reached the finals of the Indian Premier League, but lost to Chennai Super Kings. The team is considered one of the best bowling sides, often admired for its ability to defend low totals. David Warner is the leading run scorer for the side, having won the Orange Cap three times, in 2015, 2017, and 2019. Bhuvneshwar Kumar is the leading wicket-taker having won the Purple Cap twice, in 2016 and 2017. The COVID-19 pandemic impacted the brand value of the Sunrisers Hyderabad which saw a decline of 4 percent to 57.4 million in 2020 as the overall brand value of the IPL decreased to 4.4 billion, according to Brand Finance.

Franchise history
Sunrisers Hyderabad replaced the Deccan Chargers in 2012 and debuted in 2013. The franchise was taken over by Sun TV Network after the Deccan Chronicle went bankrupt. The squad was announced in Chennai on 18 December 2012. Sun TV Network Limited, which is headquartered in Chennai, is one of India's biggest television networks with 32 TV channels and 45 FM radio stations, making it India's largest media and entertainment company.

The team jersey was unveiled on 8 March 2013, and the team anthem composed by G. V. Prakash Kumar was released on 12 March 2013. The logo was unveiled on 20 December 2012, along with the announcement that the team's management would be led by Kris Srikkanth, now replaced by veteran Muttiah Muralitharan, Tom Moody and V. V. S. Laxman.

Team history

2013–2015: Initial years 
Sunrisers Hyderabad made their IPL debut in the 2013 season. They retained 20 players from the Chargers, which left slots open for 13 players (eight Indian, five overseas). They filled six of these with Thisara Perera, Darren Sammy, Sudeep Tyagi, Nathan McCullum, Quinton de Kock and Clint McKay. Kumar Sangakkara captained SRH for nine matches and Cameron White was captain for the remaining seven, as well as the eliminator match in the playoffs. In their inaugural season, the team reached the playoffs but were eliminated after losing against Rajasthan Royals by 4 wickets at Feroz Shah Kotla in Delhi on 22 May 2013. The team played all of their home games in Hyderabad.

For the 2014 season, Pune Warriors India was defunct and not replaced, leaving only eight teams in the league. The team retained two players, Dale Steyn and Shikhar Dhawan. Shikhar Dhawan and Darren Sammy were named as captain and vice captain respectively. Due to the 2014 Lok Sabha Elections, the season was partially held outside India with the opening 20 matches hosted in the United Arab Emirates and the remaining matches played in India from 2 May onwards. The team finished in 6th place with six wins and eight losses, failing to secure a place in the playoffs. Dhawan led the team for the first ten matches while Sammy led the team for remaining four.

For the 2015 season, SRH retained 13 players and released 11. David Warner was appointed as the captain for this season and led the team in all matches played. Muttiah Muralitharan was appointed the team's bowling coach as well as mentor. Sunrisers Hyderabad played their first three home games at Visakhapatnam and the remaining four home games at Hyderabad. The team again finished 6th with seven wins and seven losses, failing to reach the playoffs. Warner won the first Orange Cap for SRH.

2016–2020: Maiden title and consecutive playoff appearances 
For the 2016 season, SRH retained 15 players and released nine. After the auction, SRH traded two players. Sunrisers Hyderabad were crowned champions after defeating Royal Challengers Bangalore in the final and ending the season with 11 wins and six losses. This was their maiden, and to date only, title. Bhuvneshwar Kumar became the first Sunrisers Hyderabad player to win the Purple Cap.

For the 2017 season, SRH retained 17 players and released six from the title-winning squad. The team then spent  at the auction, leaving  remaining. As the defending champions, as per IPL norms, SRH hosted both the opening and closing ceremonies of the season. The team finished 3rd on points in the table. They lost against the Kolkata Knight Riders in the eliminator match at the M. Chinnaswamy Stadium in Bangalore. The team made a below-par total of 128–7 in 20 overs, but the Kolkata Knight Riders' innings was reduced to just six overs due to rain. The revised total was 48, which the Knight Riders met with seven wickets and four balls remaining. Bhuvneshwar Kumar was able to retain the Purple Cap while David Warner won the Orange Cap.

For the 2018 season, the Chennai Super Kings and Rajasthan Royals were reinstated in the league after serving a two-year suspension from the competition due to the involvement of their players in the 2013 IPL betting scandal. The IPL governing council decided that a maximum of five players can be retained by each IPL team. SRH retained only two players and released all remaining players from the squad. The retention of two players meant SRH went in to the 2018 IPL auction with 59 crore in their auction purse and three right-to-match (RTM) cards. The salary deduction for every retained player from the franchise's salary purse was stipulated to be 15 crore, 11 crore and 7 crore if three players were retained; 12.5 crore and 8.5 crore if two players were retained; and 12.5 crore if only one player was retained. For retaining an uncapped player, salary deduction was set at 3 crore. David Warner had stepped down from captaincy on 28 March 2018 and the BCCI announced that he will not be allowed to play in IPL 2018 following the Australian ball-tampering controversy. On 29 March, New Zealand captain Kane Williamson was chosen to lead SRH for the 2018 season. On 31 March, England batsman Alex Hales was announced as replacement for the banned David Warner. SRH finished the 2018 season as runners-up of the competition after losing to Chennai Super Kings in the final with 10 wins and seven losses. Williamson won the Orange Cap with 735 runs.

Ahead of the auction, SRH traded Shikhar Dhawan to Delhi Capitals in favour of Shahbaz Nadeem, Vijay Shankar and Abhishek Sharma. SRH retained 17 players and released nine players. On auction day (18 December 2018), SRH bought three new players; Jonny Bairstow, Martin Guptill and Wriddhiman Saha, the latter of which was bought back in the auction after initially being released. David Warner made a comeback to IPL on 24 March 2019 after he was banned by BCCI to participate in 2018 season due to Australian ball-tampering controversy. SRH decided to stay with Kane Williamson as captain and Bhuvneshwar Kumar as vice-captain. Before start of the season, Williamson was nursing an injury and Kumar led the team in the first game against Kolkata Knight Riders and from the third game till the sixth game. SRH ended the 2019 season with 6 wins and 9 losses. They lost against Delhi Capitals in the Eliminator at Dr. Y. S. Rajasekhara Reddy ACA-VDCA Cricket Stadium in Visakhapatnam. David Warner won the orange cap in this season.

Ahead of the auction, SRH retained 18 players and released 5 players. On auction day (19 December 2019), SRH bought 7 new players including the likes of Mitchell Marsh and Priyam Garg among others. SRH parted ways with Tom Moody and Simon Helmot and named Trevor Bayliss and Brad Haddin as Head coach and Assistant Coach respectively. On 27 February 2020, David Warner was reinstated as captain of SRH replacing Kane Williamson. SRH ended their 2020 campaign with 8 wins and 8 losses. In the playoffs, they beat the Royal Challengers Bangalore before losing to the Delhi Capitals in the Qualifier 2 at Sheikh Zayed Cricket Stadium in Abu Dhabi with David Warner as their highest run-scorer for the season.

2021 

Ahead of the auction, SRH retained 22 players and released 5 players. On auction day (18 February 2021), SRH bought 3 players – J Suchith, Mujeeb Ur Rahman, and Kedar Jadhav. In addition, SRH added Tom Moody back to the staff team as the Director of Cricket.

Following the team's poor start to the season with 1 win from 7 games, SRH announced Kane Williamson as their captain for the remainder of the season replacing David Warner.

2022 

Tom Moody and Simon Helmot became the head coach and assistant-coach respectively for their second stint following the departure of Trevor Bayliss and Brad Haddin as Head coach and assistant coach respectively. Dale Steyn has been appointed as the Fast bowling coach for SRH while Muttiah Muralitharan remained as the spin bowling coach. Kane Williamson led the team in the 2022 season. They finished in 8th place on the points table. After initial success, the team lost five back-to-back matches and didn't qualify for the playoffs. https://www.espncricinfo.com/series/indian-premier-league-2022-1298423/sunrisers-hyderabad-vs-lucknow-super-giants-12th-match-1304058/points-table-standings

Ahead of the Mega auction, SRH retained Kane Williamson, Abdul Samad, and Umran Malik and has released other players including Jonny Bairstow, David Warner, Rashid Khan, Manish Pandey, Sandeep Sharma and Siddarth Kaul for the 2022 Mega auction. SRH has bought Bhuvneshwar Kumar, T. Natarajan, Marco Jansen, Aiden Markram, Rahul Tripathi, Abhishek Sharma, Romario Shepherd, Washington Sundar, Nicholas Pooran and Glenn Phillips during the IPL 2022 Mega auction.

2023 
SRH appointed Brian Lara as the head coach ahead of the 2023 season replacing Tom Moody. SRH have announced Aiden Markram as the new captain for 2023 season replacing former captain Kane Williamson following a poor 2022 season.

Ahead of the auction, SRH retained 12 players while the franchise released their captain Kane Williamson and other players including Nicholas Pooran, Jagadeesha Suchith, and Romario Shepherd. On the auction day, their significant buys were Harry Brook, Mayank Agarwal, Heinrich Klaasen and Adil Rashid.

Home ground

The Rajiv Gandhi International Cricket Stadium is the principal cricket stadium in Hyderabad, Telangana state, India and is the home ground of the Sunrisers Hyderabad. It is owned by the Hyderabad Cricket Association (HCA). It is located in the eastern suburb of Uppal and has a seating capacity of 55,000.

In 2015, the 40,000-capacity Dr. Y. S. Rajasekhara Reddy ACA–VDCA Cricket Stadium, which is located in Visakhapatnam, Andhra Pradesh, was selected as the secondary home ground for Sunrisers Hyderabad and the team played their first three home games there that season.

During the 2017 season, as the Sunrisers Hyderabad were defending IPL champions, they hosted the season opener and final. SRH selected their primary home ground to host their home games.

During the 2019 season, Rajiv Gandhi International Cricket Stadium was selected to host the IPL final after the BCCI decided to shift the match from M. A. Chidambaram Stadium in Chennai after TNCA failed to secure permission to open three locked stands for the match. Hyderabad Cricket Association won the award for best ground and pitch during 2019 IPL.

Seasons

Indian Premier League

Current squad

 Players with international caps are listed in bold.

Administration and support staff

Kit manufacturers and sponsors

Result summary

By IPL season

By opposition

Champions League T20

Rivalries

Rivalry with RCB 
There is a notable rivalry between Royal Challengers Bangalore with the Hyderabad franchises, first with Deccan Chargers and now with Sunrisers Hyderabad. The clashes between Bangalore and Hyderabad have been intense with the latter ultimately dominating the former. Deccan Chargers had won 6 out of the 11 clashes between the two and Sunrisers currently lead by 12 games to the 9 games that were won by RCB. There is also a notable trend where the Hyderabad franchise has jeopardised RCB's campaign in some way or the other. The 2009 Indian Premier League Final and the 2016 Indian Premier League Final were both won by the Deccan Chargers and Sunrisers Hyderabad respectively. Their 2020 clash was also at a high stake eliminator, where a fifty by Kane Williamson trumped RCB to knock them out of IPL 2020. The most recent example would be even with their abysmal 2021 season, SRH were able to beat a on the rise RCB at a time when RCB could have reached the top 2 but ended up in the 3rd-place resulting in them having to play the eliminator, where they ended up eventually losing to KKR to knock them out of IPL 2021. Their 2022 IPL campaign was also affected by SRH, who they lost by 9 wickets after scoring 68 in their first counter and were under pressure because of their negative run rate throughout their otherwise strong campaign.

See also

List of Sunrisers Hyderabad records
Deccan Chargers

References

External links
Sunrisers Hyderabad official website

Indian Premier League teams
Cricket in Hyderabad, India
Sports clubs in India
Cricket clubs established in 2012
Cricket in Telangana
Sport in Telangana
Sun Group
2012 establishments in Andhra Pradesh